Irene Akua Agyepong is a Ghanaian public health physician with the Dodowa Health Research Center and member of the Faculty of Public Health of the Ghana College of Physicians and Surgeons. Agyepong led The Lancet commission on the future of healthcare in sub-Saharan Africa.

Early life and education 
As a child, Ageypong wanted to write, sew and become a doctor. She eventually studied medicine at the University of Ghana Medical School. She moved to the West African College of Physicians, where she was encouraged by her aunt, Phyllis Antwi, to specialise in public health. After graduating Ageypong worked as a medical locum at a mission hospital. One of her first positions was working in obstetrics; which she found emotionally challenging. In an interview with The Lancet Agyepong explained, “This was Ghana in the 1980s—we were still emerging from a really difficult economic time. Sometimes there were no gloves, there weren't the right needles, sometimes you couldn't find simple things like a scalpel…And there was no blood bank…You could have somebody die before enough blood became available. You would know what to do—but couldn't”. She was encouraged by then Director of Medical Services Moses Adibo to work internationally, and moved to the United Kingdom to study public health at the Liverpool School of Tropical Medicine. Agyepong eventually moved to the United States, where she completed a doctoral degree studying malaria control in Ghana.

Research and career 
After earning her doctorate, Ageypong returned to Ghana. She was eventually made Director of Health for the Greater Accra region. She held a joint position at the University of Ghana School of Public Health.

Select publications

References 

Living people
Ghanaian public health doctors
Year of birth missing (living people)